Gold is a 2013 German Western film directed by Thomas Arslan. The film premiered in competition at the 63rd Berlin International Film Festival.

Plot
The film depicts a trek of settlers of German and Austrian-Hungarian origin on their way through a sparsely populated part of Canada. The Group travels in 1899 from Ashcroft, British Columbia to Dawson City, following the Klondike Gold Rush.

Cast
 Nina Hoss as Emily Meyer
 Uwe Bohm as Gustav Müller
 Kindall Charters as First Indian
 Rosa Enskat as Maria Dietz
 Peter Kurth as Wilhelm Laser
 Marko Mandic as Carl Böhmer
 Wolfgang Packhäuser as Otto Dietz
 Lars Rudolph as Joseph Rossmann

Reception
Varietys Alissa Simon described the film as an "involving, naturalistic period piece" and an homage to "late-era Western". She also appreciated the cinematography for portraying the landscapes as  "ruggedly majestic".

Cine Vue's Patrick Gamble praised Nina Hoss for being "her usual captivating self" who convinces the audience she lived through a variety of strong emotions "without even flinching a muscle" but he also stated her performance was squandered because the plot offered "little in the way of entertainment or palpable suspense".

References

External links
 

2013 films
2013 Western (genre) films
2013 multilingual films
2010s German-language films
German Western (genre) films
Films set in British Columbia
German multilingual films
2010s English-language films
2010s German films